Mayorga de Campos is a town and municipality in Valladolid province, Spain, part of the autonomous community of Castile and León, Spain. Its name comes from the Leonese language, and there are several references to this village in the Middle Ages, in which Mayorga was a place in the Kingdom of León.

It was the birthplace of Saint Turibius de Mongrovejo.

External links

Spanish Culture Official Website in English

Municipalities in the Province of Valladolid
Enclaves and exclaves